Doliops is a genus of beetles in the family Cerambycidae, containing the following species:

 Doliops anichtchenkoi Barševskis, 2013
 Doliops animula Kriesche, 1940
 Doliops bakeri Heller, 1924
 Doliops basilana Heller, 1923
 Doliops bitriangularis Breuning, 1947
 Doliops conspersa Aurivillius, 1927
 Doliops curculionides Waterhouse, 1841
 Doliops du Barševskis, 2021
 Doliops duodecimpunctata Heller, 1923
 Doliops edithae Vives, 2009
 Doliops emmanueli Vives, 2009
 Doliops frosti Schultze, 1923
 Doliops geometrica Waterhouse, 1842
 Doliops gertrudis Hüdepohl, 1990
 Doliops gutowskii Barševskis, 2013
 Doliops helleri Vives, 2009
 Doliops imitator Schultze, 1918
 Doliops ismaeli Vives, 2005
 Doliops johnvictori Vives, 2009
 Doliops ligata Scwarz, 1929
 Doliops metallica Breuning, 1938
 Doliops multifasciata Schultze, 1922
 Doliops octomaculata Breuning, 1928
 Doliops pachyrrhynchoides Heller, 1916
 Doliops savenkovi Barševskis, 2013
 Doliops schultzei Barševskis & Jäger, 2014
 Doliops shavrini Barševskis, 2013
 Doliops siargaoensis Schultze, 1919
 Doliops similis Miwa & Mitono, 1933
 Doliops sklodowskii Barševskis, 2013
 Doliops stradinsi Barševskis, 2013
 Doliops transverselineata Breuning, 1947
 Doliops valainisi Barševskis, 2013
 Doliops villalobosi Heller, 1926
 Doliops viridisignata Breuning, 1947
 Doliops vivesi Barševskis, 2013

References

 
Cerambycidae genera